Hallangia is a genus of worms belonging to the family Hallangiidae.

The species of this genus are found in Northern Europe.

Species:
 Hallangia proporoides Westblad, 1946

References

Acoelomorphs